Fabre or Fabré is a surname of Occitan French origin, and a given name. Notable people with the name include:

 André Fabre (born 1945), French thoroughbred horse racing trainer
 Cándido Fabré, Cuban musician, songwriter and singer
 Catherine Fabre, French politician
 Cindy Fabre (born 1985), Miss France for 2005
 Dominique Fabre (novelist) (born 1929), Swiss detective novelist and screenwriter
 Dominique Fabre (b. 1960), French novelist
 Édouard Fabre (1885–1939), Canadian runner
 Édouard-Charles Fabre (1827–1896), former archbishop of Montreal
 Fabre d'Églantine (1750–1794), French dramatist and revolutionary
 Fabre d'Olivet (1767–1825), French author, poet, and composer
 François-Xavier Fabre (1766–1837), French painter of historical subjects
 Georges Fabre (1844–1911), French forestry engineer
 Giuseppe Fabre (1910–2007), Italian Lieutenant General and skier
 Hector Fabre (1834–1910), Canadian politician and diplomat
 Henri Fabre (1882–1984), French aviator and inventor of the first successful seaplane
 Isidro Fabré (born 1895), Cuban baseball pitcher
 Jacques E. Fabre (born 1955), Haitian-American Catholic bishop
 Jan Fabre (born 1958), Belgian stage director
 Jean-Henri Fabre (1823–1915), French entomologist
 Laurent Fabre (born 1968), French ski mountaineer
 Moumouni Fabré (born 1953), Burkinabé politician
 Pascal Fabre (born 1960), French Formula One driver
 Pierre Fabre (businessman) (1926–2013), French businessman
 Robert Fabre (1915-2006), French politician and pharmacist
 Valentine Fabre (born 1976), French ski mountaineer
 Luke fon Fabre (ND2000), a fictional character from the video game, Tales of the Abyss

See also
 Fabri
 Fabbri
 Favre
 Lefebvre

Occitan-language surnames
Surnames of French origin
Catalan-language surnames